George Dashwood Baker (4 March 1849 – 21 December 1879) was an English cricketer. Baker was a right-handed batsman who bowled right-arm fast. He was born at Compton Martin, Somerset.

Educated at Rugby School before attending University College, Oxford, Baker later made a single first-class appearance for Middlesex against Oxford University in 1872 at the Prince's Cricket Ground, Chelsea. In Middlesex's first-innings of 250, Baker was dismissed for 5 runs by Samuel Butler, while in their second-innings of 277 he was dismissed by Arthur Ridley. His only first-class appearance ended in a draw.

He died at Ayot St Lawrence, Hertfordshire on 21 December 1879.

References

External links
George Baker at ESPNcricinfo
George Baker at CricketArchive

1849 births
1879 deaths
People from Bath and North East Somerset
People educated at Rugby School
Alumni of University College, Oxford
English cricketers
Middlesex cricketers
People from Ayot St Lawrence